Ivan Panchyshyn (born 15 June 1961 in Kolodruby, Mykolaiv Raion, Lviv Oblast) is a former Ukrainian–Soviet professional football player and Ukrainian manager.

Panchyshyn played over 300 league games for FC Metalist Kharkiv.

Career

Honours
 Soviet Cup winner: 1987–88.

External links
 

1961 births
Living people
Soviet footballers
Ukrainian footballers
FC Nyva Vinnytsia players
FC Metalist Kharkiv players
FC Oleksandriya players
FC Karpaty Lviv players
FC Metalist-2 Kharkiv players
Ukrainian Premier League players
Ukrainian First League players
Ukrainian football managers
FC Metalist-2 Kharkiv managers
FC Arsenal Kharkiv managers
FC Hazovyk-KhGV Kharkiv managers
FC Nyva Vinnytsia managers
Association football defenders
Soviet Top League players
Sportspeople from Lviv Oblast